So Happily Unsatisfied is an album that was recorded by the band Nine Days. It was intended to be the follow-up to their successful major-label debut, The Madding Crowd from 2000.  The release date of the album was repeatedly delayed by Epic Records's 550 Music until the band was ultimately dropped.  In the interim, the album had leaked onto the internet.  The band has also put the whole album on their official website for the public to download.
The producer is Ron Aniello.

The band retained the rights in early 2006 and released the album on iTunes and Amazon for mp3 download.

Track listing

Demo recordings
In 2013, during the relaunch of the band's website, the band released two sets of demos that were recorded during the recording sessions for the album. They made both sets available for purchase on their website.

SHU Demos 2001
Singer John Hampson wrote on the band's website of these recordings:
In many ways, these demos "beat" the album versions. "Beautiful", "Marvelous" and "Everything" were the first three songs we had for SHU that we all really loved, and we recorded these versions with Nick Didia (producer/The Madding Crowd) in Atlanta while on tour in early 2001. These versions are much closer to what the whole album should have been like.[...]There are also a bunch of songs that never made the final cut, but probably should have.

Track list
 Beautiful
 Marvelous
 Everything
 Ocean
 The Joneses
 Ugly
 Dirty Poet
 Great Divide
 Natalie Wood
 Leelee Sobieski
 Perfect
 Clouds of Grey

SHU Demos 2
Also released was a second set of demos.  Hampson wrote:
This is the second half of all the demos we did for SHU. Most of the songs were recorded in a 2 or 3 day session we did at a studio on Long Island, NY, but "Sunspots", "American Girl" and "Angel Under The Stars" were recorded live at a rehearsal. There is also an acoustic version of "Good Friend" with alternate lyrics in the verses.

Track list
 Good Friend (Acoustic/alternate lyrics demo)
 American Girl (Live Rehearsal Demo)
 Sunspots (Live Rehearsal Demo)
 Angels Under Stars (Live Rehearsal Demo)
 Still Here
 Favorite Song
 Emily
 I Feel Fine
 Good Friend
 Marvelous
 Beautiful

Personnel
Adapted via Discogs.

Nine Days
 John Hampson – vocals, guitar
 Brian Desveaux – guitar, vocals, harmonica, mandolin
 Nick Dimichino – bass
 Jeremy Dean - keyboards
 Vincent Tattanelli  - drums 

Production
 Ron Aniello - Producer
 Chris Lord-Alge - Mixing

References

2002 albums
Nine Days albums
Epic Records albums